Korotkikh (from короткий meaning short) is a gender-neutral Russian surname.

 Sergey Korotkikh (born 1967), Soviet rower
 Yuri Korotkikh (1939–2016), Soviet footballer

References

Russian-language surnames